Badji is a surname. Notable people with the surname include:

Dominique Badji Senegalese Soccer player for Nashville SC
Bassirou Badji, Senegalese basketball player
Fayçal Badji (born 1974), Algerian footballer
Mbaye Badji (born 1976), Senegalese footballer
Landing Badji, Senegalese politician
Ndiss Kaba Badji (born 1983), Senegalese long jumper and triple jumper
Stéphane Badji (born 1990), Senegalese footballer